Zhang Lijun (born September 12, 1996 in Harbin) is a Chinese female curler.

Teams

Women's

Mixed doubles

References

External links

 Zhang Lijun - Curling World Cup profile
 Video: 

Living people
1996 births
Chinese female curlers
Pacific-Asian curling champions
Sportspeople from Harbin
Curlers at the 2022 Winter Olympics
Olympic curlers of China
21st-century Chinese women